Enos Semore was the head baseball coach at the University of Oklahoma from 1969 until 1989. During his tenure, the Sooners won 851 games, six conference championships and played in five College World Series. He resigned just days before the start of the 1990 season for medical reasons; assistant Stan Meek served as interim coach that season.

Head coaching record

References

Oklahoma Sooners baseball coaches
Bacone Warriors baseball coaches